The Asia, Pacific and Africa Collections previously called the Oriental and India Office Collections (OIOC) form a significant part of the holdings of the British Library in London, England.

India Office collection

The collections include the documents from the India Office Library and Records, relating to the entire history of British involvement in India and other parts of the eastern world, as well as materials in the languages of Asia and of north and north-east Africa. It was located at Orbit House, 197 Blackfriars Road, London. Also, until 1998, The Department of Oriental Manuscripts and Printed Books was located at 14, Store Street, off Tottenham Court Road, London. Orbit House was demolished in 2004.  

The collections also include transcriptions of baptism, marriage, and burial records of Christians of European descent, sent to Britain from India during the period of British rule, which are a vital resource in researching the genealogy of Anglo-Indians or domiciled Europeans who lived there.

External links
 Oriental and India Office Collections page on the British Library's website
 The British Library's collections 
 British Library homepage

British Library collections
Archives in the London Borough of Camden